Chester "Ches" McCance (February 19, 1915 – May 8, 1956), was a Canadian football wide receiver and placekicker who played thirteen seasons in professional gridiron football, mainly for the Winnipeg Blue Bombers. In 1976 he was inducted into the Canadian Football Hall of Fame and in 2004 he was inducted into the Manitoba Sports Hall of Fame and Museum.

McCance also curled, and represented Quebec at the 1952 and 1953 Macdonald Briers.

References

External links
Chester McCance’s biography at Manitoba Sports Hall of Fame and Museum

Winnipeg Blue Bombers players
Montreal Alouettes players
Canadian football wide receivers
Canadian football placekickers
Players of Canadian football from Manitoba
Canadian Football Hall of Fame inductees
Curlers from Quebec
Curlers from Winnipeg
Manitoba Sports Hall of Fame inductees
1915 births
1956 deaths